Carlo Sigmund Taube (born 4 July 1897 in Lodz, died 3 October 1944 in Auschwitz-Birkenau) was a Czech Jewish pianist, composer, and conductor who was murdered in the Holocaust.

Life 

Carlo Taube was born in the Lodz in Poland on 4 July 1897. He studied music in Vienna with Ferruccio Busoni and earned a living by performing in cafes in Vienna, Brno and Prague. Taube, his wife Erika and their child were deported from Prague to the Terezín (Theresienstadt) ghetto on 10 December 1941. In April 1942 he conducted the first orchestra performance in the Terezín Magdeburg caserne, premiering his own Terezín Symphony.  Taube gave a number of solo concerts and conducted the Terezín band and orchestra. He also performed in the café. Carlo and Erika Taube and their child were deported to Auschwitz-Birkenau about 1 October 1944 (arriving Auschwitz 3 October 1944), where they were murdered.

Works 

Taube composed several pieces in Terezín in addition to the Terezín Symphony.  These include:
a Ghetto Lullaby (part of a Ghetto Suite for Alto and Orchestra),
Poem, Caprice and Meditation, three short pieces for solo violin,
Ein Jüdisches Kind (A Jewish Child), a lullaby for soprano and piano (the only work by Taube to survive World War II). - recorded by Anne Sofie von Otter

References

Sources
Makarova, Elena, S. Makarov, V. Kuperman.  University Over the Abyss. 2nd Ed.  Verba Publishers, Jerusalem, 2004.
Karas, Joža. Music in Terezín, 1941-1945.  1st Ed. Beaufort Books Publishers, New York, 1985.
Kuna, Milan.  Hudba na hranici života (Engl: Music on the Boundary of Life).  1st Ed. Naše vojsko/Český svaz protifašistických bojovníků, Praha, 1990.

External links
 Biography at World ORT's Music and the Holocaust

1897 births
1944 deaths
Jews from Galicia (Eastern Europe)
Austrian pianists
Austrian male composers
Austrian composers
Male conductors (music)
Austrian Jews who died in the Holocaust
Jewish composers
Theresienstadt Ghetto prisoners
Austrian civilians killed in World War II
Austrian people who died in Auschwitz concentration camp
20th-century Austrian conductors (music)
20th-century Austrian male musicians
20th-century Austrian composers
20th-century pianists
Male pianists